Hanasaku Iroha is a 2011 26-episode anime series produced by P.A. Works, which aired in Japan on Tokyo MX between April 3 and September 25, 2011 and was also simulcast on Crunchyroll. The story follows Ohana Matsumae who ends up moving away from the city to work at the Kissuiso hot spring inn in the country. The episodes were released on six DVD and Blu-ray volumes by Pony Canyon between July 20 and November 16, 2011.



Episode list

Film

References

Hanasaku Iroha